Quigney is a suburb of East London in South Africa.

It got its name from the "Gwygney River" according to the earliest maps of East London from September 1847 by William Jervois. The municipality started to sell plots "east of the Quigney River" after 1883.

References

Populated places in Buffalo City Metropolitan Municipality